Randolph Burton (born January 14, 1987) is an Antiguan footballer who currently plays for Antigua Barracuda FC in the USL Professional Division and the Antigua and Barbuda national team.

Club career
Burton began his professional career in 2004, and spent seven seasons playing with Bassa in the Antigua and Barbuda Premier Division. With Bassa, Burton has won five Premier Division titles - in 2003-04, 2004–05, 2006–07, 2007–08 and 2009-10 - as well as two Antigua and Barbuda FA Cup titles in 2008 and 2010.

Burton also played for Bassa in three CFU Club Championship campaigns. He scored a hat trick for his team in a 10-1 win over Curaçaoan team CRKSV Jong Colombia in the 2007 tournament.

In 2011 Burton transferred to the new Antigua Barracuda FC team prior to its first season in the USL Professional Division. He made his debut for the Barracudas on April 21, 2011, a 1-0 loss to Sevilla FC Puerto Rico.

International career
Burton made his debut for the Antigua and Barbuda national team in 2008, and has since gone on to make 19 appearances for his country, scoring 6 goals. He played in two of his country's qualification games for the 2010 FIFA World Cup, against Aruba and Cuba, and was part of the Antigua squad which took part in the final stages of the 2010 Caribbean Championship.

National team statistics

International goals
Scores and results list Antigua and Barbuda's goal tally first.

References

External links

1987 births
Living people
Antigua and Barbuda footballers
Antigua Barracuda F.C. players
USL Championship players
Antigua and Barbuda international footballers
2014 Caribbean Cup players
Association football midfielders